Caenidae, or the small squaregill mayflies, is a family of insects consisting of 5 genera comprising 26 individual species. They are found throughout the world in lotic, depositional environments, and they are sprawlers. Caenids occur in quiet and even stagnant water and are often overlooked because they are so small. They like to live in silty bottoms, and their gills are specially adapted for such environments.

References

Mayflies
Insect families